Vasiliy Mikhaylovich Vakulenko (born 20 April 1980), better known by stage name Basta, and also known as Noggano, is a Russian rapper, producer and radio host. In January 2023, Ukraine imposed sanctions on Vasiliy for his support of 2022 Russian invasion of Ukraine.

Biography
Basta's father was an army officer who had served in Belarus during the 1980s. He studied at the local musical college, but did not graduate.

Basta first began to write rap songs between the ages of 15–16. In 1997, he joined the rap group Psycholyric, which he later renamed Kasta. In 1998, he recorded his first solo single "Моя Игра" (Moya Igra/My Game). Subsequently, Vakulenko assembled his own band, "Уличные Звуки" (Ulichnye Zvuki/Street Sounds). In 2004, he was noticed by Bogdan Titomir, who invited him to accompany him to Moscow. In Moscow, Basta met other performers Smoky Mo and Guf (future founder of the Centr). Later on, he participated in recording Guf's album "Город дорог" (Gorod Dorog/City of roads) and collaborated with him on the cover of his first single "Моя Игра" (Moya Igra/My Game).

In 2008, Basta adopted the stage name "Noggano", an allusion to the Nagant M1895 revolver. He recorded two albums "Ноггано первый" (Noggano: The First) and "Ноггано теплый" (Noggano Warm). After his "Noggano" project, he rebranded himself as a Gangsta rapper,  calling "Noggano" his alter ego.

In 2017, Basta was banned for 3 years from entering Ukraine as he had performed in Crimea after the 2014 Russian annexation of Crimea.

Since 2006, Basta and his business partner Yevgeny Antimoniy have owned the Gazgolder company, which with a music record label, night club, production company, management agency, talent agency, clothes shops, pubs, restaurants, vape shops, and a jewellery company under their ownership.

In October 2019, he became the owner of the FC SKA Rostov-on-Don.

Basta is married and has two children.

Discography

Albums

2006 - "Баста 1" (Basta 1)
2007 - "Баста 2" (Basta 2)
2008 - "Ноггано. Первый" (Noggano. The First)
2009 - "Ноггано. Второй (Теплый)" (Noggano. The Second (Warm))
2010 - "Баста 3" (Basta 3)
2010 - "Баста/Guf" (Basta/Guf)
2011 - "N1nt3nd0"
2011 - "ГлаЗ" (GlaZ / EyE)
2013 - "Баста 4" (Basta 4)
2014 - "ТВА"
2015 - "Баста/Смоки Мо" (Basta/Smoky Mo)
2016 - "Баста 5" (Basta 5)
2016 - "Лакшери" (Luxury)
2019 - "Папа на рейве" (Papa na reive/Daddy's on the rave)
2020 - "Gorilla Zippo, Vol.1"
2020 - "Basta 40"
2020 - "Не три" (Ne tri / Do not swipe)

Compilations

1997 - "Первый Удар" (в составе группы "Психолирик") (Perviy Udar / First Strike (feat.Psycholyric)
2005 - "Начальное творчество. Часть 1" (Nachal'noe Tvorchestvo / Initiate Creation. Part 1)
2005 - "Баста. Начальное творчество. Часть 1" (Basta. Nachal'noe Tvorchestvo / Basta. Initiate Creation. Part 1)
2008 - "К тебе" (K tebe / To You)
2009 - "Ноггано: Неизданное" (Noggano: Unpublished)
2010 - "Ноггано: Совместки" (Noggano: Featurings)
2013 - "Баста +" (Basta +)

Singles
1997 - "Город" (Gorod / City)
2006 - Мама (Mama / Mommy)
2006 - "Так плачет весна" (Tak plachet vesna / This Is How The Spring Cries)
2006 - "Раз и навсегда" (Raz i navsegda / Once And For All)
2006 - "Сам по себе" (Sam po sebe / By Itself)
2006 - "Девочка-суицид" (Devochka-suitsid / Suicide Girl)
2006 - "Ты та, что" (Ty ta, chto / You're The One Who...)
2006 - "Осень" (Osen' / Autumn)
2006 - "Мои мечты" (Moi mechty / My Dreams)
2006 - "Моя игра" (Moya Igra / My Game)
2007 - "Мне нужен бит" (Mne nuzhen bit / I Need A Bit)
2007 - "Чувства" (Chuvstva / Feelings)
2007 - "Война" (Voyna / War)
2007 - "Город дорог" (Gorod dorog / City Of Roads, feat. Guf)
2007 - "Всем берегам" (Vsem beregam / To All Coasts, feat. Centr)
2008 - "Наше лето" (Nashe leto / Our Summer, feat. MakSim)
2009 - "Не всё потеряно" (Ne vsyo poteryano / All Is Not Lost, feat. Guf)
2009 - "Ростов" (Rostov / Rostov-on-Don)
2010 - "Нет такой, как ты" (Net takoy kak ty / There Is Nobody Like You)
2010 - "Обернись" (Obernis' / Turn Around, feat. Gorod 312)
2010 - "Солнца не видно" (Solntsa ne vidno / The Sun Is Not Visible, feat. BoomBox)
2010 - "Любовь без памяти" (Lyubov' bez pamyati / Love Without Memory)
2010 - Hands Up
2010 - "Урбан" (Urban)
2010 - "Деньги" (Den'gi / Money)
2010 - "Олимпиада 80" (Olimpiada 80 / 1980 Summer Olympics)
2010 - "Кинолента" (Kinolenta / Film)
2010 - "Россия" (Rossiya / Russia)
2010 - "Свобода" (Svoboda / Freedom)
2010 - "Театр" (Teatr / The Theater)
2010 - "Ходим по краю" (Hodim po krayu / We Walk On The Edge, feat. Guf)
2010 - "Отпускаю" (Otpuskayu / I'm Absolving)
2010 - "Темная ночь" (Tyomnaya Noch' / Dark Night)
2012 - "Моя вселенная" п.у. Тати (Moya vselennaya / My Universe, feat. Tati)
2013 - Intro Basta 4
2013 - "ЧК" (Чистый кайф) (Chisty kayf / Genuine Pleasure)
2014 - "Супергерой" (Supergeroy / The Superhero)
2014 - "Моё кино" (Moyo kino / My Cinema)
2014 - Приглашение в Золотой Театр 2014 (Invitation to the Green Theater 2014, feat, Smoky Mo and Tati)
2014 - "Евпатория" (Yevpatoria, Lyapis Trubetskoy cover)
2014 - "Каменные цветы" (Kamenniye tsvety / Stone Flowers, feat. Elena Vaenga and Smoky Mo)
2014 - "Старая школа" (Staraya shkola / Old School, feat. Smoky Mo)
2015 - "Хочу к тебе" (Hochu k tebe/I Wish I Were With You, feat. Tati)
2015 - "Скрипка Страдивари" (Skripka Stradivari / Stradivari's Violin)
2015 - "Нас не нужно жалеть" (Nas ne nuzhno zhalet' / Don't Pitty Us)
2015 - "Финальный матч" (Finalny Match / The Final Match, feat. Smoky Mo. Official Match TV anthem)
2015 - "Там, где нас нет" (Tam, gde nas net / Where We Are Not)
2016 - "Я смотрю на небо" (Ya smotryu na nebo / I Look At The Sky)
2016 - "Слон" (Slon / The Elephant, feat. Aglaya Shilovskaya)
2016 - "Голос" (Golos/The Voice, feat. Polina Gagarina)
2016 - I Just Live My Life (feat. Cvpellv)
2016 - "Выпускной. Медлячок" (Vypusknoy. Medlyachok / Prom. The Slow Song)
2016 - Приглашение на фестиваль Gazgolder Live (Invitation to the Gazgolder Live feastival, feat. Dasha Charusha)
2016 - "Родная" (Rodnaya / Darling. Kalinov Most cover)
2016 - "Ангел веры" (Angel very / Angel of Faith, feat. Polina Gagarina)
2017 - "Мастер и Маргарита" (Master i Margarita / The Master and Margareth, feat. Yuna)
2017 - "Сансара" (Sansara, feat. Diana Arbenina, Alexander F. Sklyar, Skriptonit, Ant 25/17, Sergey Bobunets & SunSay)
2017 - "Папа What's Up"

References

External links 
 
 Gazgolder Records official website
  (MTV Music Award 2008 for Best Hip Hop Project)
 
 Lyrics of Basta on MuzText.com

1980 births
Living people
Russian hip hop
Russian rappers
Russian hip hop musicians
Russian National Music Award winners
Russian people of Ukrainian descent